Team Heizomat Rad-Net was a UCI Continental team founded in 2008 and based in Motten, Germany. It participates in UCI Continental Circuits races. For the 2018 season Team Heizomat, managed by Sportagentur Markus Schleicher GmbH, merged with Rad-Net Rose Team.

Team roster

Major wins

 2008
 Stage 3 Rothaus Regio-Tour, Robert Retschke
 2009
  Points classification Internationale Mainfrankentour, Sebastian Hans
  Mountains classification, Nils Plötner
 Stage 1, Sebastian Hans
 2010
 Stage 3 Flèche du Sud, Ralf Matzka

References

UCI Continental Teams (Europe)
Cycling teams based in Germany
Cycling teams established in 2007